The Etz Haim Synagogue is located in the Thiseio area of Athens, at Melidoni Street 8, across from its largest and youngest Sephardic synagogue, Beth Shalom. It was built in 1904 by Greek Romaniote Jews who came from Ioannina, and for this reason it is also called the "Romanian" or "Yannonian" synagogue by the oldest members of the community.

The first Jewish Community of Athens in the modern era was formally established in 1889 and before the first congregation was built, informal galleys were operating, such as the house of the Yusurum family at the junction of Ermou and Karaiskakis streets, while another is testified that it was operating on Ivy Street.

The synagogue suffered serious damage from the 1999 earthquake, mainly on the roof, which was radically renovated in 2006 and officially opened on 30 June 2007 by the Jewish Community of Athens. However, due to renovation, architectural interventions took place inside it and this created objections.

The Etz Chaim Synagogue only works during the great religious celebrations of the Jewish Community, and on the regular basis for all religious ceremonies is the central synagogue of Athens, Synagogue Beth Shalom. Both synagogues are managed by Rabbi Gabriel Negrin, who was elected by the council of Athens’ Jewish community following the death of the longtime leader Jacob Arar in 2014.

See also
Beth Shalom Synagogue (Athens)
Ancient Synagogue in the Agora of Athens
History of the Jews in Greece

References

19th-century synagogues
Romaniote synagogues
Sephardi Jewish culture in Greece
Sephardi synagogues
Synagogues completed in 1904
Synagogues in Athens